Eva Bergman (born 5 September 1945) is a Swedish film, theatre and television director who worked at Dramaten. She is the daughter of Swedish director Ingmar Bergman, and was married to crime writer Henning Mankell from 1998 until his death in 2015.

Filmography 
En Midsommarnattsdröm (1990) (TV)
Trappen (1991) (TV)
One Love and the Other (1994)
Gisslan (1996) (TV)
Faust (1996) (TV)
Sven (1997)

References

External links 

1945 births
Living people
Swedish film directors
Swedish women film directors
Litteris et Artibus recipients
People from Helsingborg Municipality